Calotis lappulacea, commonly known as the yellow burr-daisy, is a flowering plant in the family Asteraceae found in many parts of mainland Australia. It is a small, perennial herb with yellow globular flower-heads.

Description
The stems and leaves are sparsely covered with coarse, rough to flattened, straight, rigid hairs. Flowering occurs mostly from September to January but may flower throughout the year.

Taxonomy and naming
The specific epithet "lappulacea" refers to the genus Lappula of stiffly hairy plants. The yellow burr-daisy first appeared in scientific literature in 1837, published by the systematic botanist George Bentham from a specimen collected by Ferdinand Bauer.

Distribution and habitat
Yellow burr-daisy is a widespread species growing on a variety of soils including dry rocky situations, on heavy clay soils and occasionally in woodland in the Australian Capital Territory, Northern Territory and all mainland states of Australia.

References 

Astereae
Plants described in 1837
Flora of New South Wales
Flora of Victoria (Australia)
Flora of Queensland
Flora of South Australia
Flora of the Northern Territory
Flora of Western Australia